Charaxes barnsi is a butterfly in the family Nymphalidae. It is found on the island of Príncipe. The species was named by James John Joicey and George Talbot in 1927.

Charaxes barnsi is a large butterfly with a brown ground colour and a very wide metallic blue band punctuated by light blue (tinged violet).The male is a little smaller than the female which reaches 105 mm. It is considered part of the Charaxes tiridates group.

References

External links
Charaxes barnsi images at Consortium for the Barcode of Life 
African Butterfly Database Range map via search

barnsi
Butterflies of Africa
Endemic fauna of São Tomé and Príncipe
Fauna of Príncipe
Butterflies described in 1927
Taxa named by George Talbot (entomologist)